Gordan Barić (born 11 August 1994) is a Croatian footballer who plays for NK Rudeš as a defender.

References

External links

1994 births
Living people
People from Leninsk-Kuznetsky
Association football defenders
Croatian footballers
NK Bistra players
NK Slaven Belupo players
NK Lokomotiva Zagreb players
NK Rudeš players
NK Inter Zaprešić players
First Football League (Croatia) players
Croatian Football League players